Nupserha oxyura is a species of beetle in the family Cerambycidae. It was described by Francis Polkinghorne Pascoe in 1867. It is known as a long horn from Sumatra and Borneo.

Varietas
 Nupserha oxyura var. postflavipes Breuning, 1950
 Nupserha oxyura var. elongatoides Breuning, 1950
 Nupserha oxyura var. oxyuroides Breuning, 1950

References

oxyura
Beetles described in 1867